Ari Djepaxhia (born 4 October 1991) is an Albanian footballer who currently plays as a midfielder.

Club career

Vllaznia
Djepaxhia made his debut for Vllaznia Shkodër in a home game against Kastrioti Krujë on 13 December 2009. He started the game in midfield but his first professional game was short lived because he was sent off following a foul on Olsi Gocaj as the last man.

He joined coach Elvis Plori at Burreli in January 2019.

Career stats

References

External links

1992 births
Living people
Footballers from Shkodër
Albanian footballers
Association football forwards
KF Vllaznia Shkodër players
FK Partizani Tirana players
KS Ada Velipojë players
KS Veleçiku Koplik players
Besëlidhja Lezhë players
KS Burreli players
Kategoria Superiore players
Kategoria e Parë players